SFH may refer to:
Smoke Free Home, when used in ads
 San Felipe International Airport, Mexico (IATA code)
 Schwere Feldhaubitze, a family of German army artillery pieces, including the 15 cm sFH 18
 Single-Family Home
 Shit From Hell, a Canadian band founded by Warren Kinsella
 Star Fucking Hipsters, an American punk rock band
 Symphisis-Fundal Height, a measure used to assess fetal growth during pregnancy
 Security Forces Hospital, a hospital in Saudi Arabia
 Scott Foster Harris (active from 2006), American musician